Comics journalism is a form of journalism that covers news or nonfiction events using the framework of comics, a combination of words and drawn images. Typically, sources are actual people featured in each story, and word balloons are actual quotes. The term "comics journalism" was coined by one of its most notable practitioners, Joe Sacco. Other terms for the practice include "graphic journalism," "comic strip journalism", "cartoon journalism", "cartoon reporting", "comics reportage", "journalistic comics", and "sketchbook reports".

Visual narrative storytelling has existed for thousands of years, but comics journalism brings reportage to the field in more direct ways. The use of the comics medium to cover real-life events for news organizations, publications or publishers (in graphic novel format) is currently at an all-time peak.  Comics journalism publications are active in the United States, the United Kingdom, France, the Netherlands, Italy, and India, and comics journalists also hail from such countries as Russia, Lebanon, Belgium, Peru, and Germany. Many of the works are featured online and in collaboration with established publications, as well as the small press. In recent decades, works of comics journalism have appeared in such publications as Harper's Magazine, The Atlantic, The New Yorker, The New York Times, The Boston Globe, The Guardian, Slate, Columbia Journalism Review, and LA Weekly.

History 
Antecedents to comics journalism included printmakers like Currier and Ives and George Luks, who illustrated American Civil War battles; and political cartoonists like Thomas Nast. Historically, pictorial representation (typically engravings) of news events were commonly used before the proliferation of photography in publications such as The Illustrated London News and Harper's Magazine.

In the 1920s, the political magazine New Masses sent cartoonists to cover strikes and labor battles, but they were restricted to single panel cartoons.

In the 1950s and the 1960s, Harvey Kurtzman did a number of true comics journalism pieces for magazines like Esquire and TV Guide. In 1965, Robert Crumb, later a key founder of the underground comix movement, produced "Bulgaria: A Sketchbook Report" for Kurtzman's Help!, a tongue-in-cheek journalistic overview of the socialist country of Bulgaria, based on his own travels there. Crumb had done an earlier, similar "sketchbook report" on Harlem, which was also published in Help! Kurtzman also hired Jack Davis and Arnold Roth to do light-hearted journalistic comics for Help!

Editor/cartoonist Leonard Rifas' two-issue series Corporate Crime Comics (Kitchen Sink Press, 1977, 1979) was an early example of comics reportage, with a number of notable contributors, including Greg Irons, Trina Robbins, Harry Driggs, Guy Colwell, Kim Deitch, Justin Green, Jay Kinney, Denis Kitchen, and Larry Gonick.

Joe Sacco is widely considered to be one of the pioneers of the form, starting with his 1991 series Palestine. In the late 1990s and early 2000s, Sacco produced a number of works of comics journalism for such established publications as Details, Time, The New York Times Magazine, The Guardian, and Harper's Magazine. Since then, he has published a number of book-length works of comics journalism.

In October 1994 cartoonist Bill Griffith toured Cuba for two weeks, during a period of mass exodus, as thousands of Cubans took advantage of President Fidel Castro's decision to permit emigration for a limited time. In early 1995, Griffith published a six-week series of stories about Cuban culture and politics in his strip Zippy. The Cuba series included transcripts of conversations Griffith had conducted with various Cubans, including artists, government officials, and a Yoruba priestess.

Cartoonist Art Spiegelman was comics editor of Details in the mid-1990s; in 1997 — modeling himself after Harvey Kurtzman — Spiegelman began assigning comics journalism pieces to a number of his cartoonist associates, including Sacco, Peter Kuper, Ben Katchor, Peter Bagge, Charles Burns, Kaz, Kim Deitch, and Jay Lynch. The magazine published these works of journalism in comics form throughout 1998 and 1999, helping to legitimize the form in popular perception.

Starting in 1998, and really intensely in the years 2000 to 2002, Peter Bagge did a number of comics journalism stories — on such topics as politics, the Miss America Pageant, bar culture, Christian rock, and the Oscars — mostly for Suck.com.

In the period 2000–2001, cartoonist Marisa Acocella Marchetto produced the semi-regular comics journalism strip The Strip for The New York Times, often on the topic of fashion.

Some of the first known magazines focused specifically on comics journalism include Mamma!, a magazine of comics journalism printed in Italy since 2009 and produced by a group of authors; and Symbolia, a digital magazine of comics journalism for tablet computers, which operated from 2013 to 2015. Other digital magazines which focused on comics journalism during this period included Darryl Holliday & Erik Rodriguez' The Illustrated Press and Josh Kramer's The Cartoon Picayune.

Jen Sorensen was editor of the "Graphic Culture" section of Splinter News (formerly Fusion) from 2014 to 2018, while Matt Bors has edited the online comics collection The Nib since 2014; both sites publish comics journalism pieces.

In May 2016, The New York Times put comics journalism front-and-center for the first time with "Inside Death Row," by Patrick Chappatte (with Anne-Frédérique Widmann), a five-part series about the death penalty in the United States. In 2017, it published "Welcome to the New World," by Jake Halpern and Michael Sloan, chronicling a Syrian refugee family settling in the United States. The series ran in the print Sunday Review edition from January to September 2017 and won the Pulitzer Prize for Editorial Cartooning in 2018.

In November 2019 the book Libia, about the war in Libya, written by Francesca Mannocchi and drawn by Gianluca Costantini, was published in Italy; it was translated and published in France in 2020.

Techniques 
As with traditional journalism, there are no rules per se about comics journalism, and there are a wide variety of practices. Some practitioners, like Joe Sacco and Susie Cagle, have a background in journalism, while others were trained first as cartoonists. One feature that unites all forms of comics journalism is a reliance on witness interviews and other primary sources. Many practitioners highlight the form's power to engender empathy in its subjects.

Sacco is a trained journalist who extensively documents his subjects and spends years crafting his stories. Among the techniques he uses to protect his subjects — who are often survivors of conflict zones in the Middle East and the former Yugoslavia — are to change their names and use his art to anonymize their faces.

Wendy MacNaughton sketches extensively with her subjects and locations before retreating to her studio to craft the finished piece.

Austrian graduate student Lukas Plank created a comic, "Drawn Truth: Transparency in Journalist Comics," based on his research into the field, that outlines some potential "best practices" for comics journalists.

In a February 2005 article on comics journalism for Columbia Journalism Review, Kristian Williams introduced, explained, and defended comics journalism:

Comics journalists 

 Dan Archer
 Peter Bagge
 Matt Bors
 Steve Brodner
 Susie Cagle
 Claudio Calia
 Patrick Chappatte
 Sue Coe
 Gianluca Costantini
 Sarah Glidden
 Carlo Gubitosa
 Wendy MacNaughton
 Marisa Acocella Marchetto
 Josh Neufeld
 Ted Rall
 Leonard Rifas
 Joe Sacco
 Jen Sorensen
 Seth Tobocman
 Sam Wallman
 Chip Zdarsky
 Orijit Sen

Magazines of comics journalism

Active 
 Cartoon Movement, platform for works of graphic journalism and editorial cartoons
 Drawing the Times, international platform for graphic journalism
 The Nib, American online non-fiction comics publication founded and operated by Matt Bors. Published under Medium from 2013 to 2015 and under First Look Media from 2016 to 2019. Now member-supported.
La Revue Dessinée, French quarterly of comics journalism. Published since 2013 by Éditions du Seuil.

Defunct 
 The Cartoon Picayune, American anthology of comics journalism and nonfiction comics, published from 2011 to 2017. Founded and edited by Josh Kramer.
 The Illustrated Press, Chicago-based outlet founded by Darryl Holliday. Active from 2011 to 2015.
Mamma!, Italian printed magazine of comics journalism, editorial cartoons, data journalism, and photojournalism. Founded by Carlo Gubitosa and published by cultural association Altrinformazione from 2009 to 2013.
Symbolia, American digital magazine of comics journalism. Published from 2013 to 2015.

See also
Autobiographical comics
Visual journalism

Further reading 
 Duncan, Randy, Michael Ray Taylor, and David Stoddard. Creating Comics as Journalism, Memoir and Nonfiction. Routledge (2015) 
 Najarian, Jonathan. "Graphic depictions: Long-form comics as journalism," Quill (June 23, 2022).

References

External links

The Nib
Cartoon Movement
Drawing the Times

La Revue Dessinée
World Comics Network, grassroots nonfiction comics from around the world
Positive Negatives, produces literary comics, animations, and podcasts about contemporary social and humanitarian issues
'Symbolia website (archived)
Dan Archer's "An introduction to comics journalism, in the form of comics journalism," Poynter
"A graphics journalism project from The New York Times is taking readers inside death row", Poynter
"Comic Books as Journalism: 10 Masterpieces of Graphic Nonfiction," by Kirstin Butler for The Atlantic''

Types of journalism
Comics genres